Juan Ortiz may refer to:

Juan Ortiz (captive), Spaniard held 1528–1539 by Native Americans in Florida
Juan Esteban Ortiz (born 1987), Colombian footballer
Juan Ortiz de Matienzo, Spanish colonial judge
Juan Ortiz de Zárate (c. 1521–1575), Spanish Basque explorer and conquistador
Juan Ortiz de Zárate (bishop) (1581–1646), Spanish bishop of Salamanca
Juan David Ortiz, American border patrol agent and suspected serial killer
Juan Felipe Ortiz (born 1964), Cuban long jumper
Juan Laurentino Ortiz (1896–1978), Argentine poet
Juan Manuel Ortiz (disambiguation)
Juan Manuel Ortiz (Uruguayan footballer) (born 1982), Uruguayan football forward
Juanma Ortiz (footballer, born 1982), Spanish footballer
Juanma Ortiz (footballer, born 1986), Spanish football forward
 Juan Ortiz, founder of the musical ensemble mariachi band Campanas de America
 Juan David Ortiz, suspected American Serial Killer